Alfred James Chotzner (28 March 1873 – 12 February 1958) was a British judge and Conservative politician.

He was the son of Joseph Chotzner, a notable rabbi. Alfred was educated at Harrow and Cambridge University, and afterwards entered the Indian Civil Service, rising to become a High Court judge. In 1931 Chotzner was elected as a Member of Parliament for Upton, but resigned his seat in 1934.

References

Bibliography

1873 births
1958 deaths
Alumni of St John's College, Cambridge
Conservative Party (UK) MPs for English constituencies
UK MPs 1931–1935
Jewish British politicians
Indian Civil Service (British India) officers
Judges of the Calcutta High Court
People educated at Harrow School